The Chinese pygmy dormouse, (Typhlomys cinereus) is a species of rodent of the family Platacanthomyidae found in China and Vietnam.

Subspecies
Musser and Carleton (2005) recognized five subspecies. While the northwest Vietnamese form Typhlomys cinereus chapensis is often treated as a distinct species, it falls within the normal variance of Chinese T. cinereus.
Pygmy dormouse or soft-furred tree mouse Typhlomys cinereus Milne-Edwards, 1877
T. c. cinereus Milne-Edwards, 1877
T. c. chapensis Osgood, 1932
T. c. daloushanensis Wang & Li, 1996
T. c. guangxiensis Wang & Chen, 1996
T. c. jingdongensis Wu & Wang, 1984

Description
It has prominent, nearly hairless ears and white whiskers. The dorsal fur is dark greyish-brown and the underparts are grey with white-tipped hairs. The tail has whorls of scales near its base while the hindermost two-thirds are bushy with a tufted white tail-tip.

Distribution
The Chinese pygmy dormouse is native to Vietnam and the Chinese provinces of Anhui, Fujian, Guangxi, Guizhou, Hubei, Hunan, Jiangxi, Shaanxi, Sichuan, Yunnan, and Zhejiang.

Behaviour
The Chinese pygmy dormouse lives in mountain forests, including bamboo forests, where it climbs in trees. It can also burrow, but is not blind (a fact that might have been deduced from the genus name Typhlomys). It feeds on parts of plants including leaves, stems, fruit, and seeds. Little is known about the reproduction of this species, but the females have four nipples and pregnant females containing two to four embryos have been found.  It may use echolocation for its nocturnal activities.

Status
The Chinese pygmy dormouse is retiring and seldom seen, so may be more abundant than is apparent. It is present in primary forest and the edge of degraded forest, but does not seem to inhabit secondary forest. A number of national parks and other protected areas are within its range, and no particular threats have been identified, so the International Union for Conservation of Nature has assessed it as being of "least concern".

References

Oriental dormice
Mammals described in 1877
Taxonomy articles created by Polbot